Adult Swim is a Canadian English language discretionary specialty channel owned by Showcase Television, Inc., a subsidiary of Corus Entertainment. The channel primarily airs animated- and live-action comedies targeting a teenage and young adult audience.

The channel was originally launched in 2001 as Showcase Action (later Action), a digital cable spin-off of Showcase focused on action series and films. The channel was re-launched as Adult Swim on April 1, 2019; its branding is licensed from the Adult Swim programming block broadcast by Warner Bros. Discovery's Cartoon Network. The channel was spun off from the Adult Swim block that aired on the Canadian version of Cartoon Network (marking the first time the brand has been used for a full-time channel), and the Teletoon at Night block that had aired on its parent channel Teletoon.

History

As Showcase Action/Action (2001–2019) 

In November 2000, Alliance Atlantis was granted approval by the Canadian Radio-television and Telecommunications Commission (CRTC) for a new category 2 specialty service named "Action Television", which would be devoted to entertainment programming in the action genre. The channel launched on September 7, 2001, as Showcase Action, a spin-off of its analog specialty channel Showcase.

On January 18, 2008, Alliance Atlantis's broadcasting assets were acquired by CW Media, a joint venture between Canwest and Goldman Sachs Capital Partners. The channel was renamed Action on August 31, 2009. On October 27, 2010, the channel was acquired by Shaw Media as part of its acquisition of Canwest.

By 2011, Action had begun to diverge from its original format, increasingly acquiring reality shows from the U.S. network TruTV. In 2011, Action would begin airing two original comedy programs, The Drunk and On Drugs Happy Funtime Hour and Kenny Hotz's Triumph of the Will, both of which were cancelled after one season. Another original series, But I'm Chris Jericho!, starring Canadian-born professional wrestler Chris Jericho, premiered as a webseries in 2013 on Action's YouTube channel, and was later acquired for a second season by CBC Television's digital outlet CBC Comedy.

On May 1, 2015, a high definition feed of Action was launched. In 2016, Shaw Media was acquired by its sister company Corus Entertainment.

As Adult Swim (2019–present) 
On March 4, 2019, Corus announced that Action would be relaunched as Adult Swim on April 1, 2019, marking the first time that the brand—which is usually associated with a late-night programming block aired by Cartoon Network—would be used for a 24-hour channel. The network would launch with a two-month free preview, while full episodes of the channel's programming were made free to watch on-demand until January 2020. Shows announced for the channel's launch included Rick and Morty, Robot Chicken, Tim & Eric's Bedtime Stories, The Eric Andre Show, and Lazor Wulf, the latter of which was announced to premiere day-and-date with the U.S service.

Much like its U.S. counterpart, Corus had previously operated Adult Swim as a block on the Canadian version of Cartoon Network, while its parent channel Teletoon had also carried the similarly-positioned Teletoon at Night; both blocks were discontinued as part of the launch. From March 2016 through November 2018, Time Warner had also operated an Adult Swim subscription video on demand service for Android and iOS devices via Adult Swim Games, which streamed some of Adult Swim's original programming in Canada. New episodes were added to the app following their U.S. airings, Originally, Rick and Morty and Robot Chicken premieres were only added after they aired in Canada. Beginning with its third season, new episodes of Rick and Morty were added the next day after their U.S. premiere. In 2017, new episodes from Samurai Jack'''s fifth season were added two days after they premiered on Adult Swim's Toonami block.

During Corus Entertainment's 2022 upfronts presentation, Adult Swim announced two additional original series, including Psi Cops, and an animated adaptation of the Québécois comic book Red Ketchup (co-commissioned with Télétoon).

Programming
Adult Swim primarily airs animated and live-action comedy programming, including original productions from the U.S. block, acquisitions from its sister streaming service HBO Max (such as Harley Quinn), and off-network reruns of animated sitcoms. The network has also picked up English dubs of original French-language series produced for Télétoon's late-night block Télétoon la nuit, including The Bizarre Stories of Professor Zarbi and Doomsday Brothers.Unlike its U.S. counterpart, the channel does not offer a Toonami block, although it has picked up anime co-commissioned by Adult Swim/Toonami (such as Blade Runner: Black Lotus and Housing Complex C). To fulfill Canadian content requirements, the channel also carries reruns of Canadian-produced library content (including original series that had been produced for the previous Adult Swim and Teletoon at Night blocks), and a made-for-TV film on weekday mornings (a holdover from Action).

Current programming

As of March 2023:American Dad!ArcherBirdgirlThe Bizarre Stories of Professor ZarbiBlade Runner: Black LotusBob's BurgersDelta StateDoomsday BrothersThe Eric Andre ShowFamily GuyFugget About ItHarley QuinnJoe Pera Talks with YouKing of the HillLazor WulfMomma Named Me SheriffPrimalRick and MortyRobot ChickenSmiling FriendsSquidbilliesThe Super Dave Osborne ShowT. and T.Teenage EuthanasiaThree Busy DebrasTuca & BertieYOLOYoung JusticeUpcoming programmingBob and Margaret (March 27, 2023)Psi Cops (Winter 2023)Red Ketchup (2023)Rick and Morty: The Anime (TBA)Royal Crackers (TBA)Uzumaki (TBA)

Former programming

As a channel12 oz. Mouse  2 Nuts and a Richard!  Apollo GauntletAqua Teen Hunger ForceAssy McGee  Ballmastrz: 9009Batman: The Animated SeriesBeef HouseBlack DynamiteBlack JesusThe Brak ShowCheck It Out! with Dr. Steve BruleChina, IL  The Cleveland Show  Clone High  DeckerDelocatedDream Corp LLCThe Drinky Crow Show  EagleheartFrisky Dingo  GēmusettoThe Greatest Event in Television HistoryHarvey Birdman, Attorney at Law  The Heart, She HollerHome MoviesHot PackageHot Streets  Housing Complex C  InfomercialsThe Jellies!JJ Villard's Fairy TalesKnuckleheadsLoiter SquadMetalocalypse  MinoriteamMoral Orel  Mostly 4 Millennials  Mr. Pickles  Neon Joe, Werewolf HunterNTSF:SD:SUV::Off the AirPelswickSamurai JackSaul of the Mole MenSealab 2021The Shivering TruthSpace Ghost Coast to CoastStroker and Hoop  SuperjailTender TouchesTigtoneTim and Eric Awesome Show, Great Job!  Tim & Eric's Bedtime StoriesTitan MaximumTom Goes to the Mayor  Tropical Cop TalesThe Venture Bros.  Your Pretty Face Is Going to HellAs a programming blockThe Awesomes  Axe Cop  Crash Canyon  Fat Guy Stuck in InternetFuturama  Golan the InsatiableLucy, the Daughter of the Devil  Napoleon DynamiteNight SweatsPerfect Hair ForeverStone QuackersUndergrads  Xavier: Renegade Angel''

See also 

 Télétoon la nuit

References

External links

Television channels and stations established in 2001
2001 establishments in Canada
Adult Swim
Corus Entertainment networks
Digital cable television networks in Canada
English-language television stations in Canada